Aluni (also Romanized as Ālūnī) is a city in the Central District of Khanmirza County, Chaharmahal and Bakhtiari province, Iran, and serves as capital of the county. At the 2006 census, its population was 2,297 in 481 households. The following census in 2011 counted 2,639 people in 625 households. The latest census in 2016 showed a population of 2,775 people in 734 households. The city is populated by Lurs.

References 

Khanmirza County

Cities in Chaharmahal and Bakhtiari Province

Populated places in Chaharmahal and Bakhtiari Province

Populated places in Khanmirza County

Luri settlements in Chaharmahal and Bakhtiari Province